The 1947 NCAA Swimming and Diving Championships were contested in March 1947 at the Pavilion Pool at the University of Washington in Seattle at the 11th annual NCAA-sanctioned swim meet to determine the team and individual national champions of men's collegiate swimming and diving in the United States.

Ohio State topped the team standings for the third consecutive year, capturing the Buckeyes' fourth national title.

Team standings
Note: Top 10 only
(H) = Hosts
Full results

See also
List of college swimming and diving teams

References

NCAA Division I Men's Swimming and Diving Championships
NCAA Swimming And Diving Championships
NCAA Swimming And Diving Championships